SeaCoast Airlines was an airline headquartered in its private terminal on the grounds of St. Petersburg-Clearwater International Airport in unincorporated Pinellas County, Florida, near Clearwater. It operated from 2002 to 2012.

History
The airline began aircraft charter service on July 4, 2002, to Key West and Marathon from St. Petersburg-Clearwater International Airport. Their fleet consisted of 2 twin-engine Navajo Chieftains which hold 9 passengers each. They provided charter service throughout Florida and other Southern States 24 hours a day, 7 days a week.

On Wednesday, December 5, 2012, the airline announced it was going out of business, effective immediately. This announcement followed closely by an announcement by Southwest Airlines that it was beginning regular service between Tampa and Key West.

Fleet
2 - Piper PA-31 Navajo

See also 
 List of defunct airlines of the United States

External links
 SeaCoast Airlines

Airlines based in Florida
Companies based in Clearwater, Florida
Regional airlines of the United States
Defunct airlines of the United States
Airlines established in 2002
Airlines disestablished in 2012